PS-114 Keamari-III is a constituency of the Provincial Assembly of Sindh.

General elections 2013

General elections 2018

See also
 PS-113 Keamari-II
 PS-115 Keamari-IV

References

External links
 Election commission Pakistan's official website
 Awazoday.com check result
 Official Website of Government of Sindh

Constituencies of Sindh